The Silent Baron is a 2021 Nigerian action drama film produced and directed by Ifeanyi Ukaeru and Richard Omos Iboyi in collaboration with the National Drug Law Enforcement Agency under the production company of Ekwe Nche Entertainment Limited  to celebrate the United Nations Day Against Drug Abuse and Illicit Trafficking. The film stars Ejike Asiegbu, Sani Muazu, Ngozi Nwosu, Nancy Isime, Enyinna Nwigwe, Anthony Munjaro, and Doris Ifeka.

Premiere 
The Premiere of the film took place on 26 June 2021, the United Nations Day Against Drug Abuse and Illicit Trafficking at Silverbird Entertainment Centre, Abuja. In attendance were the Vice President of Nigeria, Professor Yemi Osinbajo, Chairman, the National Drug Law Enforcement Agency, Buba Marwa. Adamawa North Senatorial District representative Sen. Ishaku Abbo, member representing Adamawa Central Senatorial District Senator Aishatu Dahiru Ahmed (Binani), Director-General of the National Council For Arts and Culture, Otunba Olusegun Runsewe, Former Chairperson of the Economic and Financial Crimes Commission (EFCC) Farida Waziri and Secretary of NDLEA, Barr. Shedrack Haruna.

Synopsis 
Anselm is a drug dealer who employs young ladies in his illicit drug trafficking business. He deceitfully lures a lady into a relationship only to use her as a courier. Anselm encounters Frank, a highly disciplined NDLEA officer saddle with the responsibility of making sure that Nigeria is not decertified by the American Drug Administration as a result of increased flow of drug activities

Cast 

Adunni Ade
Anthony Monjaro
Enyinna Nwigwe
Jibola Dabo
Nancy Isime
Ngozi Nwosu
Doris Ifeka
Ejike Asiegbu
Priscilla Okpara

References 

2021 action drama films
Nigerian action drama films
English-language Nigerian films
2020s English-language films